Yakhan Begum was a Karkiya princess, who was the daughter of the last Karkiya ruler Khan Ahmad Khan (r. 1538–1592), and the Safavid princess Maryam Begum. 

In 1591, the Safavid prince Mohammad Baqer Mirza was engaged to Yakhan Begum, but in the end a marriage did not take place due to the opposition of her father. Mohammad Baqer's father Shah Abbas I (r. 1588–1629) then decided to marry Yakhan Begum in 1602, but she died in the same year.

Sources 
 
 

16th-century Iranian women
17th-century Iranian women
16th-century births
1602 deaths
16th-century people of Safavid Iran
17th-century people of Safavid Iran